Harriette Merrifield Forbes  (October 22, 1856 – 1951) was an American author, artist, gardener and botanical collector.

Biography
Harriette Merrifield Forbes was born as Hattie Merrifield on 22 October 1856 in Worcester, United States of America. She married William Trowbridge Forbes (1850-1931), who taught mathematics at Robert College in Constantinople, and moved to USA to study law. He later became judge in Worcester in 1888.

Forbes was one of the pioneers of gravestone art. She photographed the early gravestones throughout central and eastern Massachusetts, even before the invention of the technically advanced “Brownie camera and flexible film”. Her extensive works on stone carvers and gravestones were published in 1927 as the Early New England Gravestones and the Men Who Made Them, Hanson considers this, as “groundbreaking” since it became the base for other researches on this topic.

Esther Forbes (1891-1967), author and antiquarian, was one of her daughters. Forbes “served as her daughter's most important researcher.” 

She died in 1951.

Works 
Forbes's works include.
 Gravestones of Early New England and the Men Who Made Them (1927) 
 The Hundredth Town: Glimpses of Life in Westborough 1717-1817
 New England Diaries, 1602-1800: A Descriptive Catalogue of Diaries, Orderly Books and Sea Journals

References

1856 births
1951 deaths
20th-century American historians
Writers from Worcester, Massachusetts
Historians of the United States